The Poseidon Adventure is a 2005 American made-for-television disaster film based on Paul Gallico's 1969 novel of the same name. It is a loose remake of the 1972 film of the same name and its 1979 sequel.

Plot
The plot centers on the SS Poseidon, a 135,000-ton state-of-the-art luxury cruise ship on a cruise from Cape Town to Sydney as well as the stories and dramas of some of the 3,700 passengers and crew. A terrorist operation plans to sink the ship. Four terrorists take two bombs aboard to sink the ship. Sea Marshal Mike Rogo is assigned to the ship to search for any suspicious activity. Passenger and father, Richard Clarke, is having an affair with Shoshanna, a crew member. His family is drifting away from him, and his wife Rachel kicks him out of the family's stateroom. Dylan, their 12-year-old son, witnesses this and is devastated. His older sister, Shelby, is in nursing school and falls in love with the ship's doctor Ballard.

On New Year's Eve, a bomb planted by the group of terrorists explodes, blowing open a hole in the ship's hull. The officers on the bridge and the captain are all shot and killed by rogue waiters. Before the second bomb can explode, it is dismantled by Rogo who also shoots one of the terrorists. Because water is now entering only one side of the ship, the ship tips over, throwing many people to their deaths. As the ship continues to tilt, the center of gravity on the ship causes it to flip completely into an upside-down position. Many passengers and crew are injured, crippled, or killed. Ballard's arm is seriously injured. Shelby and one of the showgirls are trapped on a table that is secured to the floor, which is now the ceiling. They are both rescued. Shelby and Ballard then begin helping the injured.

A small group of survivors, including Shelby's mother, prepare to escape the sinking ship through the hole left by the bomb. The cruise hotel manager convinces most survivors in the ballroom to stay, claiming the ship is not sinking. Shelby decides to stay and help the injured, but knows her mother and younger brother need to leave before it is too late. The others leave the ballroom as Shelby's mother promises to leave traces where the group has gone. They then painfully depart and Shelby waves to her mother with a bloody hand as episode one ends.

Episode two begins with the navy realizing that the SS Poseidon has gone missing, and they send out a rescue team. In one of the Poseidon crew quarters, Richard and Shoshanna reach the ballroom through an air vent. Shelby confronts Shoshanna, as Richard decides to follow Rachel and the others with Ballard, Shelby, and Shoshanna. Meanwhile, the other group slowly move towards the hole, with a few people being killed. Rachel uses a damaged computer to send a mayday. Back in the ballroom, Richard's group finally decide to leave. Shelby tries to convince more people to come along but to no avail. As they leave the ballroom, a huge amount of water rushes into the ballroom, killing everyone who did not listen to Shelby.

Meanwhile, Rogo's group splits up, with Rogo taking the terrorist into deeper water to question him, while the rest of the group continues on the path to rescue. Rogo meets up with Richard's group and they all meet up again in the area where the bomb exploded. The debris is too packed to get through. When the navy arrives, their explosives make it even more impossible to get out that way. They are forced to go through the engine room to detonate the other bomb and blast their way out.

As they cross a fallen catwalk over a fiery abyss left by the engines, Shoshanna and the terrorist fall into the flames and die as the others escape. They find the other bomb, detonate it and successfully open a hole in the hull. The survivors jump into the water, and swim to nearby rescue boats. The survivors watch as Poseidon sinks bow first, while Suzanne Harrison, a British agent who had been helping out, laments the fact that there are only nine survivors.

Cast

Production

The film was made for television by Larry Levenson Productions, directed by John Putch, written by Bryce Zabel, starring Adam Baldwin, Rutger Hauer and Steve Guttenberg. It was first aired on NBC as a single three-hour event on November 20, 2005. It also aired in 2005 on the Seven Network in Australia (with the name The New Poseidon Adventure), and in 2006 on the USA Network in the United States. In this adaptation, the plot differs from the original book and first feature film in that the ship capsized because of a terrorist act. Though many of the characters remained the same, several were added. Some were dropped altogether. The character of Mike Rogo was changed to a sea marshal who works for the U.S. Department of Homeland Security.

The film's final scenes include details from the novel of the Poseidon's sinking that were not part of the 1972 film adaptation. The final shot was from the air as the ship's propellers slipped beneath the surface, which, by design or coincidence, matches several photographs taken by a news plane of the final moments of the SS Andrea Doria in 1956.

Home video
The film was released on DVD on August 22, 2006.<ref>{{cite web|url=https://www.businesswire.com/news/home/20060726005408/en/Poseidon-Adventure-Debuts-DVD-August-22-Day|title='Beyond The Poseidon Adventure Debuts on DVD August 22, Day and Date with the DVD Release of 2006 Poseidon, Featuring Outstanding Performances by Michael Caine and Sally Field|website=Business Wire|publisher=Berkshire Hathaway|date=July 26, 2006|accessdate=July 4, 2019}}</ref>

See also
 Poseidon'' (2006) - a big budget remake the following year.
 RMS Titanic
 RMS Lusitania
 SS Andrea Doria

References

External links
 
 
 

2005 television films
2005 films
2000s disaster films
2005 action thriller films
2005 thriller drama films
American thriller drama films
American disaster films
Remakes of American films
Disaster television films
Films based on thriller novels
Films about terrorism
Films set on cruise ships
Films directed by John Putch
NBC network original films
Films about survivors of seafaring accidents or incidents
Films set around New Year
Films based on American novels
Sea adventure films
American thriller television films
Action television films
2005 drama films
Films set in the Indian Ocean
Films based on works by Paul Gallico
2000s English-language films
2000s American films